Ngoy Bomboko (born May 21, 1975) is a retired Congolese football player who spent the majority of his career at TP Mazembe.

Career

Gabala loan
Ngoy Bomboko joined Azerbaijani Premier League side Gabala FC on loan for the first half of the 2007-08 season, scoring 4 goals in 11 appearances.

International
He was part of the Congolese 2004 African Nations Cup team, who finished bottom of their group in the first round of competition, thus failing to secure qualification for the quarter-finals.

Achievements
TP Mazembe
 Linafoot: 2006, 2007, 2009
 CAF Champions League: 2009, 2010
 CAF Super Cup: 2010, 2011

National team statistics

References

External links

1977 births
Living people
Democratic Republic of the Congo footballers
Democratic Republic of the Congo international footballers
TP Mazembe players
2004 African Cup of Nations players
Gabala FC players
Expatriate footballers in Azerbaijan
Association football forwards